Metallolophia albescens is a moth of the family Geometridae. It is found in China (Hunan, Zhejiang, Yunnan, Guangdong).

References

Moths described in 1992
Pseudoterpnini